Neuralized-like protein 2 is a protein that in humans is encoded by the NEURL2 gene.

Function 

This gene encodes a protein that is involved in the regulation of myofibril organization. This protein is likely the adaptor component of the E3 ubiquitin ligase complex in striated muscle, and it regulates the ubiquitin-mediated degradation of beta-catenin during myogenesis.

See also
 NEURL (gene)

References

Further reading

Human proteins